AB Mauri is an operating division of Associated British Foods (ABF). It was formed in 2004 from the bakery ingredients businesses that ABF had acquired, including those from Australian Burns Philp, Sohovos in Brazil, DSM in Europe, and Oregon-based Innovative Cereal Systems.

In January 2018, AB Mauri signed distribution deals with wine companies.

In 2021, AB Mauri placed 27th on FoodTalks' Global Top Specialty Oil Companies list.

References

External links

 AB Mauri - Company website

Bakeries of the United Kingdom